Ward Creek is a  eastward-flowing stream in Placer County, California, United States.

History
Ward Creek and Ward Peak are named for homesteader Ward Rush, whose claim was made on April 1, 1874. In the early 1980s the McClatchy family donated lands on the south side of the creek to California State Parks.

Watershed
Ward Creek, the fourth largest stream (by area and discharge) of the 63 Tahoe Basin watersheds contributes 6% of the stream runoff flowing into Lake Tahoe. The creek was a major source of sediment related to erosion from subdivisions and logging roads in the watershed. The Ward Creek watershed is just north of the Blackwood Creek watershed, and just south of Alpine Meadows Ski Resort which is on the north side of Ward Peak and Scott Peak. The creek mainstem is paralleled by Ward Creek Boulevard/Road.

Ecology
From 2006 to 2013 Ward Creek Park was restored by California State Parks, the California Tahoe Conservancy and other partners to reduce erosion which deposites sediment in Lake Tahoe, removal of fire-prone crowded trees and removal of a diversion dam.

Beaver dams on Ward Creek reduce sediment and nutrient (such as phosphorus) loads that would otherwise flow to Lake Tahoe. 
Recent evidence has shown that beaver (Castor canadensis) are native to the Sierra Nevada. Their dams do not appear to pose barriers to trout passage.

Recreation
Ward Creek Park is a California State Park whose  is bordered by Ward Creek on the north and Highway 89 on the east. The area along the creek is protected by the California State Parks system. The Park has an extensive trail system that ties in with the bike path along Highway 89 and connects with USFS trails to Stanford Rock (which lies midway between Twin Peaks and the mouth of Ward Creek) and the Tahoe Rim Trail.

See also
List of Lake Tahoe inflow streams

References

External links
California State Parks: Ward Creek
Ward Creek Watershed Restoration
Ward Creek Photo gallery

Rivers of Placer County, California
Lake Tahoe
Protected areas of Placer County, California
State parks of California
Rivers of Northern California
Rivers of the Great Basin